The 2011 Nigerian Senate election in Oyo State was held on April 9, 2011, to elect members of the Nigerian Senate to represent Oyo State. Ayoade Ademola Adeseun representing Oyo Central and Hosea Ayoola Agboola representing Oyo North won on the platform of Action Congress of Nigeria, while Olufemi Lanlehin representing Oyo South on the platform of Peoples Democratic Party.

Overview

Summary

Results

Oyo Central 
Action Congress of Nigeria candidate Ayoade Ademola Adeseun won the election, defeating other party candidates.

Oyo North 
Action Congress of Nigeria candidate Hosea Ayoola Agboola won the election, defeating other party candidates.

Oyo South 
Peoples Democratic Party candidate Olufemi Lanlehin won the election, defeating party candidates.

References 

Oyo State Senate elections
Oyo State senatorial elections
Oyo State senatorial elections